Harold Jonathan Iddings (May 16, 1885 – August 25, 1952) was an American football player and coach of football, basketball and track and field. A 1909 graduate from the University of Chicago, he served as head football coach at Miami University from 1909 to 1910, at Simpson College from 1911 to 1913, at Otterbein College in 1916, and at Penn College—now known as William Penn University—in Oskaloosa, Iowa in 1921, compiling a career college football record of 16–26–1. Iddings was also the head basketball coach at the University of Kentucky (1910–1911), Simpson (1911–1914), Otterbein (1916–1917), and the Carnegie Institute of Technology (1920–1921).

College career

Iddings was an all-Big Ten Conference player at the University of Chicago in 1907 and 1908 under legendary coach Amos Alonzo Stagg. In both years he helped the Maroons to the Big Ten title.  In the 1907 and 1908 seasons the Maroons won all nine Big Ten contests and finished with an overall record of 4–1 and 5–0–1, respectively. Iddings was also the co-Big Ten champion in the pole vault in 1907. Both Iddings and Barton Haggard of Drake University reached 11’–4”.

Professional football
Iddings was a member of the Canton Bulldogs for part of the 1915 season. During this era of professional football, it was very common for players to be hired week to week. Teams did not establish rosters and added players depending on the opponent. Iddings was brought in to upgrade the left halfback position against the Detroit Heralds replacing M. J. Truesby. Late in the season, manager Jack Cusack made whole sale changes to the lineup including bringing in Jim Thorpe to take over the starting left halfback position.

Later life
After leaving coaching at the college level, Iddings was the athletic director at Thornton Township High School in Harvey, Illinois. While at Thornton he coached both basketball and football during his tenure. He coached the basketball team from 1921 to 1929 with a 59–39 record including a district title in 1925–26 season. Iddings coached the football team from 1929 to 1931 with a record of 7–5–2. He retired from Thornton in 1946 spending the rest of his life on his farm in Westville, Indiana. He died on August 25, 1952 at St. Luke's Hospital in Chicago.

Head coaching record

College football

College basketball

References

External links

1885 births
1952 deaths
American football halfbacks
American male pole vaulters
Basketball coaches from Indiana
Canton Bulldogs (Ohio League) players
Carnegie Mellon Tartans men's basketball coaches
Chicago Maroons football players
College men's track and field athletes in the United States
College track and field coaches in the United States
High school basketball coaches in Illinois
High school football coaches in Illinois
Kentucky Wildcats men's basketball coaches
Miami RedHawks football coaches
Otterbein Cardinals football coaches
Otterbein Cardinals men's basketball coaches
People from La Porte, Indiana
Simpson Storm football coaches
Simpson Storm men's basketball coaches
Sportspeople from the Chicago metropolitan area
William Penn Statesmen football coaches